The first of the Lade Baronetcies, of Warbleton in the County of Sussex, was created in the Baronetage of Great Britain on 11 March 1731 for John Lade (sometimes spelled "Ladd"), a prosperous Southwark brewer and MP for Southwark. By the terms of the patent, the childless first baronet's niece's third son succeeded as second baronet, and changed his surname from Whithorne to Lade, but died without issue, when the baronetcy became extinct.

However, the first baronet left his fortune to another great-nephew, John Inskip, an MP for Camelford, who also took the name of Lade, and who was created a baronet, also of Warbleton, in 1758. He, unfortunately, died the next year following the amputation of his leg after a fall from a horse. His wife Mary, the sister of Henry Thrale, was pregnant at the time of his death and bore a posthumous son who succeeded to the baronetcy. This Sir John Lade was cited by Samuel Johnson as an example of a young man whose personal gifts were not equal to his fortune—Johnson's intimacy with the Thrales giving him an opportunity to know the young baronet. On the death without issue of the second baronet of the second creation, 10 February 1838, the second baronetcy also became extinct.

Lade baronets, of Warbleton (1731)

Sir John Lade, 1st Baronet (1662–1740)
Sir John Lade, 2nd Baronet (1721–1747)

Lade baronets, of Warbleton (1758)
Sir John Lade, 1st Baronet (–1759)
Sir John Lade, 2nd Baronet (1759–1838)

References

Extinct baronetcies in the Baronetage of Great Britain
Baronetcies created with special remainders